Ricardo Jorge dos Santos Dias  (born 25 February 1991) is a Portuguese professional footballer who plays for U.D. Vilafranquense as a defensive midfielder.

Club career
Born in Aveiro, Dias joined FC Porto's youth system at the age of 15. On 17 October 2009, still a junior, he made his competitive debut for the first team, coming on as a second-half substitute in a 4–0 home win against Sertanense F.C. in the third round of the Taça de Portugal. He split the 2010–11 season on loan, to G.D. Tourizense and C.D. Santa Clara.

Dias signed a two-year contract with S.C. Beira-Mar on 26 July 2011. He played his first match in the Primeira Liga on 6 November, featuring the entire 2–1 home victory over C.D. Feirense. He finished his debut campaign with a further ten games, in a 13th-place finish.

In late November 2014, after cutting ties with the club, then in the Segunda Liga, Dias returned to the top division and joined C.F. Os Belenenses until 30 June 2018. He scored his first goal in the competition on 14 March 2015, the hosts' first in the 2–2 home draw with G.D. Estoril Praia.

Dias was then consecutively loaned to Feirense and Académica de Coimbra, the former side competing in the top tier, the latter in the second. He scored a career-best five goals in his season at the Estádio Cidade de Coimbra, but his team failed to win promotion as fourth; Belenenses were also renamed Belenenses SAD, and he agreed to another temporary deal in June 2018.

On 18 July 2019, Dias signed a permanent contract with Académica.

International career
Dias won 50 caps for Portugal, across five youth levels. He was part of the under-20 team that took part in the 2011 FIFA World Cup, making four appearances in Colombia for the runners-up.

Honours
Porto
Taça de Portugal: 2009–10

Portugal U20
FIFA U-20 World Cup runner-up: 2011

Orders
 Knight of the Order of Prince Henry

References

External links

1991 births
Living people
People from Aveiro, Portugal
Sportspeople from Aveiro District
Portuguese footballers
Association football midfielders
Primeira Liga players
Liga Portugal 2 players
Segunda Divisão players
S.C. Beira-Mar players
Padroense F.C. players
FC Porto players
G.D. Tourizense players
C.D. Santa Clara players
C.F. Os Belenenses players
Belenenses SAD players
C.D. Feirense players
Associação Académica de Coimbra – O.A.F. players
U.D. Vilafranquense players
Portugal youth international footballers